Yoo Ha (or spelled Yu Ha; born February 9, 1963) is a South Korean film director, screenwriter and a contemporary poet. He directed the critically acclaimed films Marriage Is a Crazy Thing (2002), Once Upon a Time in High School (2004), A Dirty Carnival (2006) and  Gangnam Blues (2015). The latter is a gangster movie with allusions to Martin Scorsese films like Gangs of New York, Mean Streets and Goodfellas.

Filmography 
 A Day of Poet Goobo (short; 1990)
 We Must Go to Apgujeong-dong on Windy Days (1993)
 Marriage Is a Crazy Thing (2002)
 Once Upon a Time in High School (2004)
 A Dirty Carnival (2006)
 A Frozen Flower (2008)
 Howling (2012)
 Gangnam Blues (2015)
 Pipeline (2021)

Bibliography

Poetry collection 
 It's Sunshining Mind to Him Who Is Leaving (1990). Tree of Books. .
 We Must Go to Apgujeong-dong on Windy Days (1991). Literature & Wisdom. .
 There Are No Ugly Brides (1991). Segye-sa. .
 Moorim Diary (1994). JoongAng M&B. .
 Love of the Sewoon Shopping Mall's Kid (1995). Literature & Wisdom. .
 Contributing to the Bruce Lee's Generation (1995). Town of Literature. .
 My Love Was Lightweight Like a Butterfly (1999). Yeolimwon. .
 The Thousand Days' Story About Horses (2000). Literature & Wisdom. .
 Whole Dinner of the World (2007). Mineum-sa. .

Essay 
 How to Appreciate Jazz Music Interestingly (1999). The Golden Branch. .

See also 
 Lee Chang-dong
 Hong Sang-soo

References

External links 
 
 
 
 
 

South Korean film directors
South Korean screenwriters
South Korean essayists
South Korean male poets
Dongguk University alumni
Sejong University alumni
People from North Jeolla Province
1963 births
Living people